This is an enumeration of notable people affiliated with Rutgers University, including graduates of the undergraduate and graduate and professional programs at all three campuses, former students who did not graduate or receive their degree, presidents of the university, current and former professors, as well as members of the board of trustees and board of governors, and coaches affiliated with the university's athletic program. Also included are characters in works of fiction (books, films, television shows, et cetera) who have been mentioned or were depicted as having an affiliation with Rutgers, either as a student, alumnus, or member of the faculty.

Some noted alumni and faculty may be also listed in the main Rutgers University article or in some of the affiliated articles. Individuals are sorted by category and alphabetized within each category. Default campus for listings is the New Brunswick campus, the systems' largest campus, with Camden and Newark campus affiliations noted in parenthesis.

Presidents of Rutgers University

Since 1785, twenty men have served as the institution's president, beginning with Jacob Rutsen Hardenbergh (1735–1790), a Dutch Reformed clergyman who was responsible for establishing the college. Before 1930, most of the university's presidents (eight of the twelve) were clergymen affiliated with Christian denominations in the Reformed tradition (either Dutch Reformed, Presbyterian, or German Reformed). Presidents Hasbrouck (1840–1850), Frelinghuysen (1850–1862), Gates (1882–1890), and Scott (1891–1906) were all laymen. Two presidents were alumni of Rutgers College: William H. S. Demarest (Class of 1883) and Philip Milledoler Brett (Class of 1892). The current president is Jonathan Holloway (born 1976). Holloway, a U.S. historian, is the first person of color to lead Rutgers University. The president serves in an ex officio capacity as a presiding officer within the university's 59-member Board of Trustees and its eleven-member Board of Governors, and is appointed by these boards to oversee day-to-day operations of the university across its three campuses. He is charged with implementing board policies with the help and advice of senior administrators and other members of the university community." The president is responsible only to those two governing boards—there is no oversight by state officials. Frequently, the president also occupies a professorship in his academic discipline and engages in instructing students.

Nobel laureates
 Milton Friedman, 1912–2006, A.B. 1932, economist, public intellectual, winner of the Nobel Prize in Economics (1976)
 Toni Morrison (honorary doctorate), taught at Rutgers, novelist (Beloved, Song of Solomon), Nobel Prize in Literature (1993), Pulitzer Prize for Fiction (1988)
 Heinrich Rohrer, 1961–1963, physicist, winner of the Nobel Prize in Physics (1986)
 Selman Waksman 1918–1958, professor of microbiology; discovered 22 antibiotics (including Streptomycin); winner of the Nobel Prize in Physiology or Medicine (1952)

Notable trustees and benefactors
 Andrew Kirkpatrick (1756–1831), lawyer, Chief Justice of New Jersey Supreme Court, trustee 1782–1809
 Littleton Kirkpatrick (1797–1859), attorney and politician, trustee 1841–1859
 Henry Rutgers (1745-1830), military officer and philanthropist after whom Rutgers is named

Notable alumni

Architecture
 Louis Ayres, Medievalist architect best known for designing the United States Memorial Chapel at the Meuse-Argonne American Cemetery and Memorial and the Herbert C. Hoover U.S. Department of Commerce Building
 Frank Townsend Lent

Arts and entertainment

Art
 Brad Ascalon, Class of 1999, industrial designer
 Alice Aycock, Class of 1968, sculptor
 Marc Ecko, fashion designer
 Lore Kadden Lindenfeld, textile designer
 Kojiro Matsukata, art collector whose collection helped form the National Museum of Western Art in Tokyo
 George Segal, GSNB 1963, sculptor

Entertainment
 Livingston Allen, hip hop YouTuber and journalist better known as DJ Akademiks
 Joanna Angel- adult film actress 
 Roger Bart, actor (Desperate Housewives, The Producers; Tony Award for You're a Good Man, Charlie Brown)
 Mario Batali, Class of 1982, chef, restaurateur, television host (Molto Mario, Iron Chef America)
 Bill Bellamy, Class of 1989, comedian, actor
 Avery Brooks, Class of 1973, actor, educator
 John Carpenter, Class of 1990, first-ever champion of Who Wants to Be a Millionaire television quiz show
 Asia Carrera (born Jessica Steinhauser), Class of 1995 (did not graduate), porn star; majored in Business and Japanese
 Kevin Chamberlin, actor (Tony Award nominations for Dirty Blonde and Seussical)
 Larry Charles, film director (Borat and Bruno)
 Jim Coane, Class of 1970, Emmy award-winning television executive producer, writer and director (Dragon Tales)
 Jessica Darrow, Class of 2017, actress and singer, voice of Luisa Madrigal in Disney's Encanto
 Kristin Davis, Class of 1987, actress (Sex and the City)
 Mike Colter, actor (Netflix's Luke Cage)
 Tim DeKay, Class of 1990 (Mason Gross School of the Arts), actor (White Collar)
 John DiMaggio, voice actor (Bender on Futurama and Jake the Dog on Adventure Time), voicework in anime (Princess Mononoke, Vampire Hunter D: Bloodlust)
 Katie Dippold, television and film writer (Parks and Recreation, The Heat)
 Wheeler Winston Dixon, filmmaker, critic, author
 Keir Dullea, actor (2001, A Space Odyssey)
 Simon Feil, Class of 2000, actor (Julie & Julia, House of Cards)
 Jon Finkel, Class of 2003, professional Magic: The Gathering player; inducted into the MTG Hall of Fame
 Calista Flockhart, Class of 1988, actress (The Birdcage, Ally McBeal), Emmy winner, spouse of Harrison Ford
 Brandon Flynn, actor (13 Reasons Why)
 Marlene Forte, (attended) actress, sister of HSN host Lesley Machado
 Gwendolyn Audrey Foster, filmmaker, critic, author
 Midori Francis, actress (Dash & Lily)
 James Gandolfini, Class of 1983, actor (The Sopranos), Emmy winner, voice actor (Where the Wild Things Are)
 Chris Gethard, comedian, actor
 Judy Gold, B.A. 1984, comedian, actress
 Dan Green, voice actor (Yu-Gi-Oh!)
 Charles Hallahan, Class of 1969 (Camden), actor (The Thing, Hunter)
 Robert Harper, Class of 1974, actor (Once Upon A Time In America, Frank's Place, Creepshow, Commander in Chief...)
 Bakhtiyaar Irani, Class of 1999, Indian television actor, participant in the Indian version of Big Brother, Bigg Boss
 Bill Jemas, Class of 1980, writer, creative director, publisher for Marvel Comics Group
 Ed Kalegi, national talk radio host and personality The Weekend with Ed Kalegi, actor
 Jason Kaplan, associate producer of The Howard Stern Show
 Jane Krakowski, Class of 1988, actress (Ally McBeal, 30 Rock)
 William Mastrosimone, Class of 1980, playwright, Golden Globe Award winner
 Christopher McCulloch, creator of The Venture Bros.
 Paolo Montalban, Broadway, television and film actor
 Luis Moro, Class of 1987, actor, comic, filmmaker, writer, Independent Spirit Award Nominee, Best Actor Nominee ABFF (Love and Suicide)
 Oswald "Ozzie" Nelson, Class of 1927, musician and actor (The Adventures of Ozzie and Harriet)
 Scott Patterson, actor (Saw IV, Saw V)
 Hasan Piker, Twitch streamer and left-wing political commentator
 Matt Pinfield, radio DJ, host of MTV's 120 Minutes
 Molly Price, actress
 Robert Pulcini, Class of 1989 (Camden), Academy Award nominated documentary and feature filmmaker, co-director of American Splendor 
 Sheryl Lee Ralph, English Lit/Theatre degree, 1975, original Deena Jones in the Broadway smash hit musical Dreamgirls, winner of six Tony Awards
 Roy Scheider, actor (Jaws, Sorcerer)
 Henry Selick, attended for a year, director ( Nightmare Before Christmas, Coraline )
 Michael Sorvino, actor, son of Paul Sorvino
 Dina Spybey, actress (Disney's The Haunted Mansion)
 Sebastian Stan, Class of 2005, actor (Captain America: The First Avenger, The Covenant)
 Aaron Stanford, Class of 2000, actor (X2, Tadpole)
 Kurt Sutter, Class of 1986, writer (The Shield), creator of Sons of Anarchy
 Daniel Travis, actor (Open Water)
 Paul Wesley, actor (Vampire Diaries)
Ashley Woodfolk, young adult fiction writer
 Cary Woodworth, Class of 1999, actor (Mary and Rhoda), songwriter
 Karen Young, actress (The Sopranos, Law & Order)
 Ramy Youssef, attended, actor (Ramy)
 Saul Zaentz, film producer (One Flew over the Cuckoo's Nest, Amadeus)
 Daniel O'Brien, Class of 2008, comedian/writer (Cracked.com, How to Fight Presidents)

Journalism
 Spencer Ackerman, Class of 2002, journalist for The Daily Beast
 Joan Acocella, Class of 1984, journalist, author, dance critic for The New Yorker
 Martin Agronsky, Class of 1936, pioneering TV journalist
 Amanda Alcantara, Class of 2012, writer and activist
 Carrie Budoff Brown, editor of Politico
 Lisa Daftari, foreign affairs investigative journalist for "The Foreign Desk" 
 Stuart Diamond, journalist, New York Times, Pulitzer Prize. Author, Getting More, NY Times bestseller
 Dylan Dreyer, meteorologist
 Rich Edson, Class of 2003, Washington correspondent, Fox News Channel
 Mike Emanuel, journalist, Chief Congressional Correspondent and former White House Correspondent for Fox News Channel
 Nick Gillespie, Class of 1985, journalist, editor
 Bernard Goldberg, Class of 1967, journalist
 Jerry Izenberg, Class of 1952, Emmy-winning sports journalist
 Amani Al-Khatahtbeh, Class of 2014, author and tech entrepreneur
 Jeff Koyen, Class of 1991, journalist and entrepreneur
 Gene Lyons, Class of 1952, political columnist
 Chi Modu, Class of 1989, photo-journalist
 Natalie Morales, Class of 1994, journalist and correspondent for The Today Show
 Richard Newcomb, Class of 1962, journalist and author, best-selling author of Iwo Jima! and Abandon Ship!
 James O'Keefe, Class of 2006, political activist
 Wendy Osefo, Class of 2016 (Camden, PhD), political commentator and assistant professor at Johns Hopkins University. 
 Rebecca Quick, Class of 1993, journalist and anchor (CNBC Squawk Box)
 Larry Stark, Class of 1956, Boston journalist and theater critic, Theater Mirror
 Mike Taibbi, Class of 1971, journalist and correspondent for NBC Nightly News
 Milton Viorst, Class of 1951, journalist, author, Middle East scholar
 Cathy Young, Class of 1988, journalist and non-fiction author

Music
 Kenny Barron, jazz pianist in Dizzie Gillespie quartet
 Laurie Berkner, children's musician; Jack's Big Music Show
 Regina Belle, singer (A Whole New World), plays during end credits of (Disney's Aladdin)
 Just Blaze, Grammy Award-nominated hip hop producer
 David Bryan, keyboardist and member of band Bon Jovi
 Jim Conti, tenor saxophonist for the third wave ska band Streetlight Manifesto
 Mike Glita, musician, producer, songwriter, manager, and former bassist for New Jersey post-hardcore band Senses Fail
 Rasika Shekar, Indo-American flautist and singer, who plays the bansuri, a bamboo flute.
 Roger Lee Hall, music preservationist, composer
 Mark Helias, bassist, composer
 Frank Iero, guitarist and backup vocals for the band My Chemical Romance; lead singer of post-hardcore/screamo band Leathermouth; co-founder of the Skeleton Crew company (dropped out, was on a scholarship)
 Ben Jelen, musician
 Brian Joo, Korean R&B singer; half of Fly to the Sky
 Tomas Kalnoky, lead singer-songwriter and lead guitarist of third wave ska band Streetlight Manifesto; formed Catch 22 and Bandits of the Acoustic Revolution
 Kenneth Lampl, Juilliard School faculty, film composer and professor
 Dan Lavery, Grammy-nominated bass player for rock group Tonic and occasionally The Fray
 Looking Glass, 1970s band, one-hit wonder with the song "Brandy"
 Earl MacDonald, Class of 1995 (M.Mus.), Director of Jazz Studies at the University of Connecticut; former musical director; pianist with Maynard Ferguson
 Marissa Paternoster, artist; lead singer-songwriter and lead guitarist of independent rock band Screaming Females and solo project Noun
 Cristina Pato, Galician bagpiper
 Pras, Grammy-winning rapper from the Fugees
 James Romig, Class of 2000 (Ph.D.), composer. 2019 Pulitzer Prize in Music, finalist
 Gabe Saporta, musician with Midtown, Cobra Starship, and Humble Beginnings
 Sister Souljah, born Lisa Williamson, Class of 1986, author
 Soraya, Colombian-American singer-songwriter, guitarist, arranger and record producer

Athletics

Baseball
 Jason Bergmann, starting pitcher for the Washington Nationals
 Joe Borowski, relief pitcher for the Cleveland Indians; played for the Chicago Cubs, Florida Marlins, New York Yankees, Atlanta Braves, Baltimore Orioles, and Tampa Bay Devil Rays
 David DeJesus, center fielder for the Oakland Athletics
 Tom Emanski, creator of Tom Emanski Instructional Videos
 Jeff Frazier, plays for the Washington Nationals organization; brother of Todd Frazier
 Todd Frazier, plays for the Texas Rangers; member of the 1998 LLWS champions, Toms River, New Jersey
 Don Taussig (born 1932), Major League Baseball player
 Jeff Torborg, Class of 1963, Major League Baseball catcher (Los Angeles Dodgers and California Angels); manager of several teams
 Eric Young, Class of 1992, Major League Baseball player

Basketball
 James Bailey, Class of 1978, NBA: 1979–1987
 John Battle, guard for the Atlanta Hawks and Cleveland Cavaliers, 1985–1995
 Hollis Copeland, NBA: 1979–1981
 Waliyy Dixon, AND1 Mixtape Tour streetball legend
 Quincy Douby, guard for the Toronto Raptors
 Brian Ellerbe, Class of 1985, head coach of the Michigan Wolverines
Luis Flores, professional basketball player, 2009 top scorer in the Israel Basketball Premier League
 Bob Greacen, NBA: 1969–1971
 Art Hillhouse, NBA: 1946–1947
 Roy Hinson, Class of 1983, NBA: 1983–1990
 Charles Jones, NBA: 1999–1999
 Dahntay Jones, NBA: 2003–2006
 Eddie Jordan, Class of 1977, head coach of the Rutgers Men's Basketball team; former head coach of the Washington Wizards
 Steve Kaplan, Class of 1972, American-Israeli basketball player in the Israel Basketball Premier League
 Herve Lamizana, Class of 2004, power forward, Indios de Mayagüez
 Bob Lloyd, NBA: 1967–1968 professional player with the New York Nets; CEO of Mindscape; Chairman of the V Foundation for Cancer Research which honors the memory of his former Rutgers backcourt teammate, Jim "Jimmy V." Valvano
 Hamady N'Diaye, Class of 2010, 26th pick of the second round (56th selection overall) in the 2010 NBA Draft to play for the Minnesota Timberwolves; his draft rights have been traded to the Washington Wizards
 Chelsea Newton, Class of 2004, Sacramento Monarchs of the WNBA
 Arthur Perry, basketball player and coach
 Cappie Pondexter, Class of 2006, 2nd overall pick in the 2006 WNBA Draft by the Phoenix Mercury; 2008 Summer Olympic gold medalist for United States Women's Basketball in Beijing
 Phil Sellers, NBA: 1976–1976
 David Stern, Class of 1963, Commissioner of the National Basketball Association
 Tammy Sutton-Brown, Class of 2001, Charlotte Sting of the WNBA
 Jim Valvano, Class of 1967, won NCAA Men's Basketball National Championship at N.C. State
 Sue Wicks, Class of 1988, member of the 1988 Olympic team and New York Liberty (1997–2002) of the WNBA
 Heather Zurich, Class of 2009, player; assistant coach of the UC Santa Barbara Gauchos team

Fencing
Alex Treves (born 1929), Italian-born American Olympic fencer, won the NCAA saber title in both 1949 and 1950, was undefeated in three years of competing in college.

Football
 Mike Barr, Class of 2004, NFL punter (Pittsburgh Steelers, Frankfurt Galaxy)
 Marco Battaglia, Class of 1996, NFL tight end (Cincinnati Bengals, Pittsburgh Steelers)
 Steve Belichick, Class of 2011, Assistant Coach for the New England Patriots
 Jay Bellamy, Class of 1994, NFL safety (New Orleans Saints)
 Brandon Bing, Class of 2011, safety for the New York Giants
 Gary Brackett, Class of 2003, NFL linebacker (Indianapolis Colts)
 Chris Brantley, Class of 1992, NFL player (Rams, Bills)
 Kenny Britt, Class of 2010 (did not graduate), NFL player (Titans)
 Frank Burns, Class of 1949, NFL quarterback (Philadelphia Eagles), Head Coach at Rutgers 1973–1983
 Michael Burton, Class of 2010, fullback for the Detroit Lions
 Deron Cherry, Class of 1980, safety with the Kansas City Chiefs; member of the NFL 1980s All-Decade Team
 Anthony Davis, Class of 2010, NFL offensive tackle (San Francisco 49ers)
 Jack Emmer, Class of 1967, NFL wide receiver (New York Jets); Hall of Fame college lacrosse coach; head coach of 2002 U.S. Lacrosse World Champions
 Eric Foster, Class of 2008, NFL defensive tackle (Indianapolis Colts)
 Gary Gibson, Class of 2005, NFL defensive tackle (Carolina Panthers)
 Clark Harris, Class of 2007, NFL tight end (Houston Texans)
 Homer Hazel, "Pop Hazel", All-American football star and member of the College Football Hall of Fame
 Carl Howard, Class of 1984, NFL cornerback (New York Jets)
 Jeremy Ito, Class of 2008
 James Jenkins, Class of 1991, NFL tight end (Washington Redskins)
 Ed Jones, Class of 1974, CFL All-Star
 Nate Jones, Class of 2004, NFL cornerback Miami Dolphins)
 Rashod Kent, Class of 2003, NFL tight end (Houston Texans)
 Alex Kroll, Class of 1962, AFL center (New York Titans), CEO of Young & Rubicam
 Brian Leonard, Class of 2007, NFL running back (Cincinnati Bengals)
 Steve Longa, linebacker (Detroit Lions)
 Ray Lucas, Class of 1996, NFL quarterback 1996–2002 (New York Jets, Miami Dolphins), TV Football commentator
 Dino Mangiero, Class of 1980, NFL defensive end (Seattle Seahawks)
 Devin McCourty, Class of 2010, Pro Bowl NFL cornerback ( New England Patriots)
 Jason McCourty, Class of 2009, NFL cornerback (Tennessee Titans)
 Mike McMahon, Class of 2001, NFL quarterback (Minnesota Vikings)
 Robert Nash, "Nasty Nash", first football player traded in the NFL and first Captain of the New York Giants
 Ryan Neill, Class of 2006, NFL defensive end (Buffalo Bills)
 Shaun O'Hara, Class of 2000, NFL center (New York Giants)
 Raheem Orr, Class of 2004, NFL defensive end, AFL DL/OL (Houston Texans, Philadelphia Soul)
 Isiah Pacheco, Class of 2022, NFL, running back (Kansas City Chiefs)
 J'Vonne Parker, Class of 2004, NFL defensive tackle (Cleveland Browns)
 Bill Pickel, Class of 1982, NFL defensive tackle (Los Angeles Raiders)
 Joe Porter, Class of 2007, NFL cornerback (Green Bay Packers)
 Nick Prisco, NFL player
 Ray Rice, NFL running back (Baltimore Ravens)
 Paul Robeson, Class of 1919, athlete, actor, singer, political activist, NFL guard 1920–1922 (Akron Pros, Milwaukee Badgers)
 Stan Rosen (1906–1984), NFL football player
 Mohamed Sanu, Class of 2012, wide receiver (Cincinnati Bengals)
 Tom Savage, attended, quarterback (Houston Texans)
 L.J. Smith, Class of 2003, NFL tight end (Philadelphia Eagles)
 Pedro Sosa, Class of 2008, offensive lineman (Miami Dolphins)
 Darnell Stapleton, Class of 2007, NFL Guard (Pittsburgh Steelers)
 Reggie Stephens, Class of 1999, cornerback (New York Giants)
 Cameron Stephenson, Class of 2007, NFL Guard (Jacksonville Jaguars)
 Tyronne Stowe, Class of 1987, linebacker (Phoenix Cardinals)
 Harry Swayne, Class of 1986, NFL lineman 1987–2001
 Rashod Swinger, NFL DT 1997–1999 (Arizona Cardinals)
 Mike Teel, Class of 2009, NFL quarterback 2009–2011 (Seattle Seahawks), quarterbacks coach (Kean University, Wagner College)
 Lou Tepper, Class of 1967, former head coach of Illinois
 Tiquan Underwood, Class of 2009, wide receiver (New England Patriots)
 Elnardo Webster, Class of 1992, NFL player, Pittsburgh Steelers
 Sonny Werblin, Class of 1932, founder of the New York Jets; President and CEO Madison Square Garden Corporation; President of Music Corporation of America-TV
 Jamaal Westerman, Class of 2009, NFL player, linebacker and defensive end (Jets)
 Jeremy Zuttah, Class of 2008, offensive lineman (Tampa Bay Buccaneers)

Powerlifting

 Lev Susany, Class of 2011, Australian powerlifter and Commonwealth record holder

Soccer
 Jon Conway, Class of 1999, goalkeeper for Chicago Fire
 Josh Gros, Class of 2003, midfielder for D.C. United
 Nick LaBrocca, Class of 2006, midfielder for Colorado Rapids
 Lev Kirshner, soccer player and San Diego State University men's soccer coach
 Alexi Lalas, Class of 1991, former U.S. Soccer National Team member, former president and General Manager of the Los Angeles Galaxy
 Carli Lloyd, midfielder for the United States women's national soccer team and the Manchester City W.F.C. 
 Steve Mokone, player for FC Barcelona and South Africa
 Peter Vermes, Class of 1987, former U.S. Soccer National Team member, former professional player in Major League Soccer

Swimming
 George Kojac, member of the International Swimming Hall of Fame; gold medalist in swimming at the 1928 Summer Olympics
 Walter Spence, member of International Swimming Hall of Fame; broke five world records in his first year of competitive swimming (1925)

Wrestling
 Nick Catone, retired professional mixed martial artist who competed in the UFC
 Anthony Ashnault, 2019 NCAA Wrestling Champion, 149 lb weight class. 4-time NCAA All-American
 Nick Suriano, 2019 NCAA Wrestling Champion, 133 lb weight class, first wrestling national champion for Rutgers

MMA
 Mickey Gall, professional mixed martial arts fighter, currently fighting in the Welterweight Division of the UFC

Hockey
Andrew Barroway, majority owner and chairman of the Arizona Coyotes.

Business
 Greg Brown, Class of 1982, President and Co-CEO of Motorola; CEO of the Broadband Mobility Solutions Business Unit
 John Joseph "Jack" Byrne, Jr., chairman and CEO of GEICO which he pulled from the brink of insolvency in the mid-1970s; chairman and CEO of White Mountains Insurance Group, formerly (Fund American Enterprises, Inc.); chairman of the Board of Overstock.com 2005–06
 Arturo L. Carrión Muñoz, former executive vice president of the Puerto Rico Bankers Association
 Stephen Chazen, CEO of Occidental Petroleum
 Jay Chiat, Class of 1953, founder of TBWA\Chiat\Day advertising
 Nick Corcodilos, professional headhunter
 Alvaro de Molina, Class of 1988, MBA, retired CFO of Bank of America
 Marc Ecko, founder of Complex magazine and CEO of Marc Ecko Enterprises
 Mark Fields, B.A. Economics, President and chief executive officer of Ford Motor Company
 Sharon Fordham, Class of 1975, CEO of WeightWatchers.com, Inc.
 Robert L. Fornaro, CEO of Spirit Airlines
 Otto Hermann Kahn, Rutgers Trustee, financier, patron of the arts
 Rana Kapoor, founder/CEO of Yes Bank
 Maryann Keller, Class of 1966, B.S., former President of Priceline.com automotive services division
 Leonor F. Loree, Class of 1877, President of the Pennsylvania Railroad
 Walt MacDonald, Class of 1974 (Camden), CEO of Educational Testing Services
 Duncan MacMillan, B.S. 1966, co-founder of Bloomberg L.P.
 Bernard Marcus, Class of 1951, founder of Home Depot
 Ernest Mario, Class of 1961, former CEO of GlaxoSmithKline
 Sherilyn McCoy, Class of 1988, MBA, CEO of Avon Products
 Gene Muller, Class of 1977 (Camden), founder and CEO of Flying Fish Brewing
 Edward H. Murphy Ph.D., retired from American Petroleum Institute
 George Norcross (Camden), insurance executive and chairman of Cooper Health System
 Randal Pinkett, Class of 1994, winner of The Apprentice 4; chairman and CEO of BCT Partners
 Robert C. Pruyn, Class of 1869, President of the Embossing Company, and the National Commercial Bank of Albany
 Gary Rodkin, former ConAgra CEO
 Bill Rasmussen, Class of 1960 MBA, founder of ESPN
 Tom Renyi, Class of 1968 (BA) and 1969 (MBA), former chairman and CEO of Bank of New York
 Barry Schuler, Class of 1976, former chairman and CEO of AOL
 Bill Schultz, Class of 1971, MBA, former CEO of Fender Musical Instruments
 Harvey Schwartz, Class of 1987, CEO of The Carlyle Group, former president and Co-Chief Operating Officer of Goldman Sachs
 Steven H. Temaras, CEO of Bed Bath and Beyond
 Sir William Cornelius Van Horne, former President of the Canadian Pacific Railway and builder of that country's Transcontinental railroad
 William Bernard Ziff, Jr., Ziff Davis Inc. publishing executive

Crime
 Melanie McGuire, B.S. 1994, convicted of murdering her husband, dismembering his body and putting it in suitcases
 Jennifer San Marco, perpetrator of the shooting at the Goleta, California United States Postal Service center on January 30, 2006, when seven people were killed.
Rana Kapoor, M.B.A. 1980, convicted for embezzlement and fraud worth $100 million.

Education
 Philip Milledoler Brett, A.B. 1892, Acting President of Rutgers University (1930–1931); corporate attorney
 Carol T. Christ, A.B. 1966, Former President of Smith College and current Chancellor of U.C. Berkeley
 Stuart Diamond, The Wharton School of business, Professor of Negotiations, Legal Studies Department; A.B. 1970, J.D. Harvard, 1990, M.B.A. Wharton (Univ of PA), 1992.
 Alvin S. Felzenberg, historian, political commentator, member of 9/11 Commission
 Charles Ferster, B.S. 1947, behavioral psychologist, author and professor (deceased 1981)
 Richard H. Fink, founder of Mercatus Center, current executive vice president at Koch Industries
 Milton Friedman, A.B. 1932, economist; public intellectual; winner of the Nobel Prize in Economics (1976)
 William H. S. Demarest, A.B. 1883, Professor of Theology and Church Government; President of Rutgers University (1906–1924), President of New Brunswick Theological Seminary
 Brigid Callahan Harrison, political science professor and academic at Montclair State University 
 Jerome Kagan, B.S. 1950, psychologist
 William English Kirwan, M.A. 1962, Ph.D. 1964, mathematician; Chancellor emeritus of the University System of Maryland (2002–2015); former President of Ohio State University (1998–2002)
 Sarah-Jane Leslie, B.A., current Dean of Princeton University Graduate School
 Earl MacDonald, Class of 1995 (M.Mus.), Associate Professor of Music at the University of Connecticut
 Lynn Mahoney, Ph.D. 1999, social historian, 14th president of San Francisco State University
 Richard P. McCormick, A.B. 1938, M.A. 1940, historian; Professor of History and Dean of Faculty at Rutgers University; President of New Jersey Historical Society
 John McWhorter, B.A. 1985, historian; author of books on linguistics and race relations; former professor of linguistics at University of California, Berkeley; Senior Fellow at Manhattan Institute
 Uma Narayan, M.A. 1990, Indian feminist professor of philosophy at Vassar College
 Roy Franklin Nichols, A.B. 1918, M.A. 1919, historian, winner of the Pulitzer Prize (1949)
John C. Norcross, B.S. 1980 (Camden) psychiatrist, university professor
Dennis A. Rondinelli, B.A. 1965, professor and researcher of public administration at the Sanford School of Public Policy. 
 Camilla Townsend, Ph.D. 1995, professor of history at Rutgers-New Brunswick
 Selman Waksman, B.Sc. 1915 M.Sc. 1916, professor of microbiology, discovered 22 antibiotics (including Streptomycin) and winner of the Nobel Prize in Physiology or Medicine (1952)
 Carl R. Woodward, B.Sc. 1914, President of the University of Rhode Island

Government, law, and public policy
 Rosemary Alito, J.D. 1978, corporate and labor attorney for K&L Gates, sister of Samuel Alito
 Curt Anderson, member of Maryland House of Delegates (1983 -); chair of Legislative Black Caucus of Maryland (1989–1991)
 Stewart H. Appleby 1913, represented  1925–1927
 Thomas J. Aquilino, J.D. 1969, Judge of the United States Court of International Trade, 1985-2004
 Adam Leitman Bailey, lawyer, defended the Ground Zero Mosque and other prominent cases
 Judith Barzilay, MLS 1971, J.D. 1981, Judge of the United States Court of International Trade, 1998-2011
 Cheri Beasley, B.A. 1988, former chief justice of NC Supreme Court, candidate for 2022 United States Senate election in North Carolina
 Joseph P. Bradley, A.B. 1836, Associate Justice, United States Supreme Court (1870–1891)
 Sam Brown, M.A. 1966, organiser of the Vietnam Moratorium and former state treasurer of Colorado
 Wayne R. Bryant, J.D. 1972 (Camden), New Jersey Senator (1995-2008)
 Donald Burdick, B.S. 1956, M.S., 1958, United States Army Major General who served as Director of the Army National Guard
 Clifford P. Case, A.B. 1925, U.S. House of Representatives (1945–1953), United States Senate (1955–1979)
 William T. Cahill, J.D. 1937 (Camden), 46th Governor of New Jersey
 Jennifer Choe-Groves, J.D. 1994, Judge of the United States Court of International Trade, 2016–Present
 David A. Christian, J.D. 2011, retired United States Army captain and former candidate for the Republican nomination in the 2012 United States Senate election in Pennsylvania
 Chris Christie, 55th Governor of New Jersey
 James Dale, B.A. 1993, respondent in Boy Scouts of America et al. v. Dale
 Simeon De Witt, A.B. 1776, Surveyor-General for the Continental Army, 1776–1783, and the State of New York, 1784–1834
 Michael DuHaime, B.A., 1995, Campaign Manager, Rudy Giuliani for President, 2008; Political Director, Republican National Committee, 2005–2006; Regional Political Director, Bush-Cheney '04, 2003–2004
 George S. Duryee B.A. 1872, Member of the New Jersey State Assembly and The United States Attorney for the District of New Jersey
 Alan Estevez, B.A. 1979, Assistant Secretary of Defense for Logistics and Material Readiness, 2011-2013; Under Secretary of Commerce for Industry and Security, 2022–Present
 Maria Fernanda Espinosa, Former President of the United Nations General Assembly
Richard Fink, B.A. in Economics founded the Center for Study of Market Processes at Rutgers University. After the Koch brothers donated $30 million, it moved to George Mason University in the 1980s and in 1999 it became the Mercatus Center. 
 James J. Florio, J.D. 1967 (Camden), 49th Governor of New Jersey (1990–1994)
 Louis Freeh, Class of 1971, Director of the FBI (1993–2001)
 Frederick T. Frelinghuysen, A.B. 1836, United States Senate (1866–1869, 1871–1877); Secretary of State (1881–1885)
 Scott Garrett, J.D. 1984 (Newark), U.S. House of Representatives (2003–2017)
 Anthony Genatempo, B.S. Physics 1990, United States Air Force, Major General 1991–present
 Scott Gration, Obama nominee for NASA Administrator
 John H. Griebel, B.S. 1926, Marine Corps General
 Diane Gutierrez-Scaccetti, M.S. 1987, Nominee for the Commissioner of the New Jersey Department of Transportation
 Garret A. Hobart, A.B. 1863, industrialist, Vice President of the United States (1897–1899)
 Elie Honig, 1997, assistant United States Attorney and CNN senior legal analyst
 James J. Howard, M.Ed. 1958, represented New Jersey's 3rd congressional district in the United States House of Representatives 1965–1988
 Richard J. Hughes, J.D. 1931, New Jersey Governor, Chief State Supreme Court Justice
 William Hughes, Class of 1955, Congressman, United States Ambassador to Panama
 Jack H. Jacobs, Class of 1966, M.A. 1972, Medal of Honor recipient, military analyst for MSNBC
 Robert E. Kelley, highly decorated and youngest Lieutenant General in USAF history; Superintendent of the United States Air Force Academy, 1981–83
 Herbert Klein, member, United States House of Representatives
 Stephanie Kusie, Member of Canadian Parliament for Calgary Midnapore
 Joseph Lazarow, Mayor of Atlantic City, New Jersey 1976–1982
 Kenneth LeFevre, B.S. 1976 (Camden), member of the New Jersey General Assembly 1996–2002
 Wu Weihua, Vice Chairman of the Standing Committee of the National People's Congress of the People's Republic of China
 Tim Louis, Member of the Parliament of Canada
 George C. Ludlow, A.B. 1850, 25th Governor of New Jersey
 Gail D. Mathieu, J.D (Newark), current United States Ambassador to Namibia and former United States Ambassador to Niger
 Dina Matos, former First Lady of New Jersey and ex-wife of former NJ governor Jim McGreevey 
 Ivy Matsepe-Casaburri, South African Minister of Communications (1999 -)
 D. Bennett Mazur (c. 1925–1994), member of the New Jersey General Assembly
 Bob Menendez, J.D. (Newark), U.S. House of Representatives (1992–2005); United States Senator (2006–present)
 Anne Milgram, Attorney General of New Jersey and first Assistant Attorney General of New Jersey
Geoffrey H. Moore was the ninth U.S. Commissioner of the Bureau of Labor Statistics. He was known as the father of Business Cycles. He was a graduate of the College of Agriculture at Rutgers University intent on a career in poultry after having worked after school and summers for a chicken farmer.
 A. Harry Moore, J.D., Governor of New Jersey, U.S. Senator from New Jersey
 David A. Morse, A.B. 1929, Director-General of ILO who accepted the Nobel Peace Prize in 1969 on behalf of the ILO
 Joseph A. Mussomeli, J.D. 1978 (Camden), former ambassador to Slovenia and Cambodia
 William A. Newell, A.B. 1836, physician; Governor of New Jersey (1857–1860)
 George Norcross (Camden, attended), Democratic Party fundraiser, insurance and media executive
Janet Norwood served as the first female Commissioner of the Bureau of Labor Statistics when she was appointed by President Jimmy Carter. She graduated from the New Jersey College of Women, which is now Douglass Residential College, in 1945 and inducted into the Rutgers Hall of Distinguished Alumni in 1987 Hall of Distinguished Alumni.
 Hazel O'Leary J.D., U.S. Secretary of Energy (1993–1997)
 Edward J. Patten, J.D. 1927 (Newark), U.S. House of Representatives (1963–1980)
 Clark V. Poling, A.B. 1933, one of the Four Chaplains killed on the troop transport 
 Robert H. Pruyn, A.B. 1833, A.M. 1836, second United States Ambassador to Japan
 Dana Redd, B.A. 1989 (Camden), Mayor of Camden, New Jersey.
 Matthew John Rinaldo, B.S. 1953, represented New Jersey in the United States House of Representatives for twenty years, in the 12th congressional district (1973–1983) and in the 7th congressional district (1983–1993)
 Norman M. Robertson, New Jersey State Senator
 Eduardo Robreno, J.D. 1978 (Camden), Federal Judge for the United States District Court for the Eastern District of Pennsylvania
 Richie Roberts, (Newark), prosecutor who took down Frank Lucas, portrayed in the movie American Gangster
 Peter W. Rodino, Jr., J.D. 1937, Congressman
 Maria Rodriguez-Gregg, B.A. 2013 (Camden), member of the New Jersey General Assembly
 Esther Salas, J.D. 1991, United States district judge of the United States District Court for the District of New Jersey 
 David Samson, B.A. 1961, New Jersey Attorney General from 2002 to 2003
 Salvatore Eugene Scalia, law clerk and father of Supreme Court justice Antonin Scalia
 Mike Schofield, B.A., Republican member of the Texas House of Representatives; former policy advisors to then Governor Rick Perry
 James Schureman, A.B. 1775, Continental Congress, Senator
 Martin J. Silverstein, B.A. 1976, United States Ambassador to Uruguay from 2001 to 2005
 Gregory M. Sleet, J.D. 1976 (Camden), Federal Judge for the United States District Court for the District of Delaware
 Elliott F. Smith (1931–1987), politician who served in the New Jersey General Assembly from 1978 to 1984, where he represented the 16th Legislative District (New Jersey).* Jeremiah Smith, 6th governor of New Hampshire
 Mark Sokolich, B.A., Mayor of Fort Lee, New Jersey
 Danene Sorace, MPP, Mayor of Lancaster, Pennsylvania
 Darren Soto, B.A. 2000, U.S. House of Representatives Florida District 9 (2014–Present)
 Charles C. Stratton, 15th Governor of New Jersey
 Gary Stuhltrager B.A. (Camden), J.D. (Camden), eight-term member of the New Jersey General Assembly
 Robert Torricelli, Class of 1974, United States Senator, Congressman
 Foster M. Voorhees, A.B. 1876, Governor of New Jersey (1898, 1899–1902)
 Elizabeth Warren (Newark), United States Senator (D-MA); Chair of the Congressional Troubled Asset Relief Program (TARP)
 Jacob R. Wortendyke, 1839, represented  in the United States House of Representatives 1857–1859
 Barbara Wright, M.Ed., member of the New Jersey General Assembly

Library and information science
 Lily Amir-Arjomand M.L.S., founder of the children's public library system in Iran and former leader of the Iranian Institute for Intellectual Development of Children and Young Adults 
 William B. Brahms B.A. 1989, M.L.S. 2003, librarian and reference book writer
 Ted Hines, M.L.S. 1958, Ph.D. 1960, librarian, pioneer in computer information cataloging systems

Literature
Adaeze Atuegwu, Class of 2002, author
Janine Benyus, natural sciences writer
 Holly Black, author Spiderwick Chronicles(attended)
 James Blish, Class of 1942, science fiction and fantasy author; wrote A Case of Conscience, winner of 1959 Hugo Award for Best Novel and 2004 Retrospective Hugo Award for Best Novella
 Lester Brown, Class of 1955, environmental analyst and author
 Denise Drace-Brownell, military writer
 Marian Calabro, author and publisher of history books; founder and president of CorporateHistory.net
 Jonathan Carroll, Class of 1971, author
Vincent Czyz, Class of 2002, author
 Junot Díaz, Class of 1991, author of The Brief Wondrous Life of Oscar Wao, winner of 2008 Pulitzer Prize for Fiction and 2007 National Book Critics Circle Award
 Janet Evanovich, Class of 1965, best-selling author
 Michael Farber, sports journalist, Elmer Ferguson Memorial Award recipient, Hockey Hall of Fame selection committee member
 Richard Florida, author and public intellectual
 Alfred Joyce Kilmer, Class of 1908 (did not graduate), poet, died in France during World War I; author of "Trees"
 Paul Lisicky, Class of 1983 (Camden), MFA 1986 (Camden), author, creative writing professor, 2016 Guggenheim Fellow 
 Lawrence Millman, Ph.D., travel writer and mycologist
 Ankhi Mukherjee - Ph.D., professor of literature at University of Oxford
 Ira B. Nadel, Class of 1965, M.A. in 1967, biographer, literary critic, distinguished professor at University of British Columbia
 Daniel Nester, Class of 1991 (Camden), poet and essayist
 Fabian Nicieza, Class of 1983, comic book writer and editor; X-Men, X-Force, New Warriors, Cable and Deadpool, Thunderbolts
 Daniel O'Brien, Class of 2008, humorist and novelist
 Gregory Pardlo, Class of 1999 (Camden), poet, recipient of the 2015 Pulitzer Prize for Poetry
 Robert Pinsky, Class of 1962, Poet Laureate of the United States, Pulitzer Prize nominee
 Nina Raginsky, Class of 1962, photographer
 Katherine Ramsland, true-crime author, professor of forensics psychology at DeSales University
 Philip Roth, Attended (Newark) author
 Rudy Rucker, Masters and PhD in mathematics, author of science fiction as well as non-fiction books on mathematics, computer programming, and the future of technology
 Michael Shaara, Class of 1951, author of The Killer Angels, winner of 1975 Pulitzer Prize for Fiction
 Doris Sommer, Professor of Romance Languages at Harvard University
 Judith Viorst, children's literature author; Alexander and the Terrible, Horrible, No Good, Very Bad Day
 Dave White, Class of 2001, Derringer Award-winning mystery author
 Wesley Yang, essayist, columnist for Tablet magazine, author of The Souls of Yellow Folk

Medicine
 Michael S. Gottlieb, Class of 1969, first physician to identify acquired immune deficiency syndrome (AIDS) as a new disease
 Howard Krein, otolaryngologist and plastic surgeon, husband of Ashley Biden and son-in-law of 46th United States President Joe Biden
 James Oleske, pediatrician who published one of the first articles identifying HIV/AIDS in children
 Sandra Saouaf, immunologist
 Albert Schatz, graduate assistant to Selman Waksman, co-discovered Streptomycin
 Selman Waksman, Class of 1915, discovered 22 antibiotics, best known for streptomycin; Nobel laureate. Waksman Institute of Microbiology and Waksman Hall are named in his honor

Religion
 Eugene Augustus Hoffman (A.Bz. 1847), Dean and "Our Most Munificent Benefactor" of The General Theological Seminary of the Episcopal Church (New York City)
 Matthew Leydt (A.B. 1774), Rutgers' first alumnus and Dutch-Reformed Minister
 William P. Merrill (D.D. 1904), first president on the Church Peace Union, writer of "Rise Up, O Men of God"
 Clark V. Poling, Dutch-Reformed Army Chaplain among the "Four Chaplains" on the troop transport  during World War II
 Vernon Grounds (B.A. 1937), theologian, Christian educator, Chancellor of Denver Seminary, one of the founders of American Evangelicalism
 Michael Plekon (Master's in Sociology and Religion 1977), priest, author, sociologist and theologian

Royalty
 Ewuare II, Oba of Benin

Science and technology
 Santanu Bhattacharya, PhD 1989, chemical biologist & materials chemist at the Indian Institute of Science
 Wendy Brewster, Professor of Obstetrics and Gynaecology at the University of North Carolina at Chapel Hill
 Angela Christiano, molecular geneticist in dermatology at Columbia University
 Stanley N. Cohen, Class of 1956, geneticist, pioneer in gene splicing
 Robert Cooke, first researcher to identify antihistamines
 Simeon De Witt, A.B. 1776, geographer for George Washington and Continental Army during the American Revolution
 Elma González, PhD 1972, plant cell biologist
 Louis Gluck, Class of 1930, engineer; considered the father of neonatology, the science of caring for newborn infants
 Thomas H. Haines, biochemist, father of Director of National Intelligence Avril Haines
 Danielle Hairston, psychiatrist; faculty at Howard University College of Medicine
 Terry Hart, Class of 1978, astronaut, president of LORAL Skynet
 Daria Hazuda, B.S., biochemist known for discovering the first HIV Integrase Strand Transfer Inhibitors
 George William Hill, Class of 1859, mathematician and astronomer, first President of the American Mathematical Society
 George Duryea Hulst, clergyman, botanist, entomologist
 Mir Imran, Class of 1976, BS Electrical Engineering (1976), MS Bio Engineering (1978), winner of 2005 Rutgers University Distinguished Engineer Award
 Geraldine Knatz, Class of 1973, first female port director of the Port of Los Angeles
 Jason Locasale, Class of 2003, scientist; pioneer in the area of modern metabolism research
 Richard Swann Lull, paleontologist
 George Willard Martin, mycologist and academic
 Harry A. Marmer, oceanographer
 Charles Molnar, inventor of personal computer LINC (acknowledged as the 1st personal computer by IEEE)
 Nathan M. Newmark, Class of 1948, inventor of the Newmark-beta method of numerical integration used to solve differential equations; winner of the National Medal of Science
 Daniel G. Nocera, Class of 1979, chemist noted for work on proton coupled electron transfer 
 Eva J. Pell, Class of 1972, plant pathologist
Edward Rebar, biologist
 Carl Safina, writer and ecological scientist
 Peter C. Schultz, Class of 1964, co-inventor of fiber optics
 John Scudder, physician; research pioneer in the field of blood storage and replacement
 Raymond Seeger, Class of 1926, physicist, fluid dynamics researcher, winner of the Navy Distinguished Public Service Award
 Harold Hill Smith, geneticist, responsible for fusing human and plant cells
 Jessica Ware, Entomologist at American Museum of Natural History
 Heather Zichal, Deputy for Energy and Climate Change in Obama Administration

Social sciences
 Dorothy Cantor, Psy.D. 1976, former president of the American Psychological Association
 Alycia Halladay, Chief Science Officer of Autism Science Foundation

Notable faculty

Arts

 Emma Amos, professor of fine arts; postmodernist painter and printmaker; member of Spiral; editorial board member of feminist journal Heresies; member of Fantastic Women in the Arts
 Julianne Baird, professor of music (Camden), soprano 
 Vivian E. Browne, painter, professor of art
 Angelin Chang, former associate professor of music; Grammy Award-winning classical pianist
 Leon Golub, professor of fine arts
 Al Hansen, professor of finer arts; a founder of Fluxus
 Allan Kaprow, professor of fine arts
 Roy Lichtenstein, professor of fine arts
 Robert Moevs, professor of music
 George Segal, professor of fine arts; Fluxus artist
 Robert Watts, professor of fine arts
 Charles Wuorinen, professor of music; Pulitzer Prize–winning composer and MacArthur fellow

Economics
Harry Gideonse (1901–1985), President of Brooklyn College, and Chancellor of the New School for Social Research

Library and information science
 Marc Aronson, Professor of Library and Information Science, author and historian
 Nicholas J. Belkin, Professor of Library and Information science
 Paul S. Dunkin, Professor Emeritus of Library Services
 Elizabeth Futas, Professor of Library and Information Science
 Peggy Sullivan, Lecturer

Literature
 Miguel Algarín, Professor of English
 Giannina Braschi, Professor of Spanish, author of Yo-Yo Boing! and United States of Banana
 John Ciardi, Professor of English, poet, translator of Dante's The Divine Comedy
 Mark Doty, Professor of English, poet
 William C. Dowling, Professor of English
 Ralph Ellison, author of Invisible Man
 Francis Fergusson, Professor of English, literary critic
 H. Bruce Franklin, John Cotton Dana Professor of English and American Studies (Newark); expert on Herman Melville, science fiction, and prison literature
 Joanna Fuhrman, poet
 Paul Fussell, Professor of English, author, literary critic, social commentator
 Rafey Habib, Professor of Literature (Camden), poet
 Stanley Kunitz, Visiting Professor of Literature (Camden), poet
 Paul Lisicky, Professor of English and Creative writing (Camden), author
 Alicia Ostriker, Professor of English, poet
 Gregory Pardlo, Professor of English (Camden), poet
 David S. Reynolds, Professor of Literature (Camden), cultural critic

Medicine
 Sidney Pestka, Professor of Microbiology and Immunology at the Robert Wood Johnson Medical School; the "father of interferon"; received the National Medal of Technology
 Robert A. Schwartz, Professor and Head of Dermatology at the Rutgers New Jersey Medical School; co-discoverer of AIDS-associated Kaposi sarcoma and the Schwartz-Burgess syndrome
 René Joyeuse MD, MS, FACS, Office of Strategic Services Allied intelligence agent during World War II, CMDNJ Assistant Professor of Surgery, co-founder of the American Trauma Society, involved in training physicians and EMS personnel in trauma care.
 Michel Kahaleh, Clinical Director of Gastroenterology, Chief of Endoscopy, and Director of the Pancreas Program at the Department of Medicine, Robert Wood Johnson Medical School
 James Oleske, is the emeritus François-Xavier Bagnoud (FXB) Professor of Pediatrics at Rutgers New Jersey Medical School. He was one of the first physicians to recognize that children could be infected with HIV/AIDS.

Law 
 Robert E. Andrews, adjunct professor at the School of Law in Camden, Congressman, U.S. House of Representatives
 Ruth Bader Ginsburg, professor at the School of Law in Newark, Associate Justice of the Supreme Court of the United States
 Arthur Kinoy, professor at the School of Law in Newark; civil rights litigator for leftist causes
 Wendell Pritchett, Chancellor of Rutgers University–Camden, Interim Dean and Presidential Professor at the University of Pennsylvania Law School, and Provost of the University of Pennsylvania
Raphael Lemkin, Professor of International Law at the School of Law in Newark, Jurist who coined the term Genocide and key drafter and campaigner for the UN Genocide Convention

Mathematics
 Abbas Bahri (1955–2016), professor of mathematics
 József Beck, professor of mathematics
 Haim Brezis, professor of mathematics
 Israel Gelfand (1913–2009), professor of mathematics
 Daniel Gorenstein (1923–1992), professor of mathematics
 Samuel L. Greitzer (1905–1988), professor of mathematics, founding chairman of the United States of America Mathematical Olympiad
 András Hajnal (1931–2016)— professor of mathematics
 Henryk Iwaniec, professor of mathematics
 Jeffry Ned Kahn, professor of mathematics
 János Komlós, professor of mathematics, winner of the Alfréd Rényi Prize (1975)
 Michael Saks, professor of mathematics, winner of the Gödel Prize (2004)
 Glenn Shafer (1992–present), professor of mathematical statistics, co-creator of the Dempster-Shafer theory
 Saharon Shelah, professor of mathematics
 Doron Zeilberger, professor of mathematics; winner of the Steele Prize for Seminal Contributions to Research (1998)

Philosophy
 Elisabeth Camp, associate professor of philosophy
 Ruth Chang, professor of philosophy
 Frances Egan, professor of philosophy
 Jerry Fodor, professor of philosophy and cognitive science
 Alvin Goldman, professor of philosophy
 Peter D. Klein, professor of philosophy
 Brian Leftow, William P. Alston Chair in Philosophy of Religion
 Ernest Lepore, professor of philosophy
 Alan Prince, professor of linguistics and cognitive science, founder of Optimality Theory (OT)
 Zenon Pylyshyn, professor of philosophy and cognitive science
 Theodore Sider, professor of philosophy
 Holly Martin Smith, Distinguished Professor of Philosophy
 Stephen Stich, professor of philosophy
 Robert Weingard, professor of philosophy
 Samuel Merrill Woodbridge (1819–1905), professor of metaphysics and philosophy of the human mind (1857–1864)
 Dean Zimmerman, professor of philosophy
 Larry Temkin, professor of philosophy
 Barry Loewer, Distinguished professor of philosophy and director of the Rutgers Center for Philosophy and the Sciences

Physics
 Thomas Banks, professor of physics
 Girsh Blumberg, professor of physics
 Herman Carr, professor of physics, pioneer of magnetic resonance imaging
 Piers Coleman, professor of physics
 Michael R. Douglas, former professor of physics (now at Simons Center for Geometry and Physics, Stony Brook)
 Daniel Friedan, professor of physics
 Gabriel Kotliar, professor of physics
 Joel Lebowitz, professor of mathematical physics
 Gregory Moore, professor of physics
 Nathan Seiberg, former professor of physics (now at Institute for Advanced Study, Princeton)
 Stephen Shenker, former professor of physics (now at Stanford University)
 Rachel Somerville, professor of physics and astronomy
 David Vanderbilt, professor of physics
 Alexander Zamolodchikov, professor of physics

Science and engineering
 Jean Ruth Adams, entomologist and virologist
Willard H. Allen, poultry scientist and New Jersey secretary of agriculture
 C. Olin Ball, professor of food engineering, chair of the Department of Food Science
 Richard Bartha, professor of microbiology and biochemistry; discoverer of "oil eating bacteria"
 Helen M. Berman, chemistry professor, former Director of the RCSB Protein Data Bank
 Kenneth Breslauer, Linus C. Pauling professor of chemistry and chemical biology
 Stephen K. Burley, Director of RCSB Protein Data Bank and the Center for Integrative Proteomics Research
 Stephen S. Chang, professor of food science and Nicholas Appert Award winner
 Albert Huntington Chester, mining engineer, professor of chemistry, mineralogy, and metallurgy, explorer, and namesake of Chester Peak
 Hettie Morse Chute, professor of botany
 Vašek Chvátal, professor of computer science
 George Hammell Cook, State Geologist of New Jersey and Vice President of Rutgers College
 Michael R. Douglas, Director of New High Energy Theory Center; Sackler Prize winner
 Richard H. Ebright, professor of chemistry
 Helen Fisher, research professor of anthropology
 Robin Fox, professor of anthropology
 Apostolos Gerasoulis, professor of computer science; creator of the Teoma/Ask search engine
 Alan S. Goldman, professor of chemistry
 Chi-Tang Ho, professor of food science and Stephen S. Chang Award for Lipid or Flavor Science winner
 Tomasz Imielinski, professor of computer science
Yogesh Jaluria, Board of Governors Professor and Distinguished Professor of Mechanical and Aerospace Engineering.
Paul B. Kantor, professor of information science
 Leonid Khachiyan, professor of computer science; creator of the first polynomial time algorithm for linear programming
Lisa C. Klein, Distinguished Professor of Materials Science and Engineering
 Alan Leslie, professor of cognitive science and psychology
 Jing Li, chemist
 Paul J. Lioy, Professor of Environmental and Occupational Medicine, UMDNJ, Robert Wood Johnson Medical School
 Michael L. Littman, professor of computer science
 Wilma Olson, professor of chemistry and physics, BioMAPS Institute for Quantitative Biology
 Lawrence Rabiner, professor of electrical and computer engineering
 Robert Schommer, astronomer, professor of physics
 Myron Solberg, professor of food science; founding director of the Center for Advanced Food Technology at Rutgers; Nicholas Appert Award winner
 Mario Szegedy, professor of computer science; two-time winner of Godel Prize
 Endre Szemerédi, professor of computer science
 Lionel Tiger, professor of anthropology
 Jay Tischfield, professor of genetics
 Robert Trivers, professor of anthropology and biological sciences and winner of the Crafoord Prize in Biosciences (2007)
 Kathryn Uhrich, professor of chemistry, Area Dean of Mathematical and Physical Sciences
 Selman Waksman, professor of microbiology and winner of the Nobel Prize in Physiology or Medicine (1952)
 Judith Weis, professor emeritus of marine biology
 Martin Yarmush, professor of biomedical and chemical & biochemical engineering, Fellow: US National Academy of Inventors and US National Academy of Engineering
Lujendra Ojha, assistant professor of planetary sciences.

Social sciences
 Stephen Bronner, professor of political science, comparative literature and German studies
 Charlotte Bunch, founder and Director the Center for Women's Global Leadership, activist and author
 Arthur F. Burns, professor of economics, 10th Chairman of the Federal Reserve
 Mason W. Gross, professor of classics, President of Rutgers University (1959–1971)
 Paul Lazarsfeld, prominent sociologist and pioneering communication theorist (Newark)
 William D. Lutz, Professor of linguistics (Camden), leading theorist on doublespeak
 Gerald M. Pomper, professor of political scientist, leading expert on election studies
 Robyn Rodriguez,  former professor of sociology, established the first Filipino studies center in U.S. at U.C. Davis

History
 Peter Charanis, Voorhees Professor of History; Byzantine historian
 Erica Armstrong Dunbar, Professor of History and executive producer of The Gilded Age
 Lloyd Gardner, Mary and Charles Beard Professor of History and distinguished diplomatic historian
 Annette Gordon-Reed, Professor of History (Newark), winner of the Pulitzer Prize for History 1999
 Michael Kulikowski, Professor of History at the University of Tennessee and author of Late Roman Spain and Its Cities (Johns Hopkins University Press), 2004, and Rome's Gothic Wars from the Third Century to Alaric (Cambridge University Press)
 David Levering Lewis, former Professor of History; twice winner of the Pulitzer Prize for Biography or Autobiography (1994 and 2001)
 Tomás Eloy Martínez, Professor of Latin American studies; Argentinian journalist and writer
 Marysa Navarro (born 1934), Professor of History
 Phillip S. Paludan, Professor of History (Camden)
 Said Sheikh Samatar, Professor of History (Newark)
 Jacob Soll, Professor of History (Camden), MacArthur Fellow 2011
 Traian Stoianovich, Professor of History
 Camilla Townsend,    Professor of History

Athletic coaches and staff
 Dick Anderson, football coach (1984–1989); assistant coach at Lafayette College, University of Pennsylvania and Penn State
 George Case, baseball coach (1950–1960), including 1950 College World Series berth; former Major League Baseball player with the Washington Senators and Cleveland Indians; four-time All-Star and six-time American League leader in stolen bases
 Lev Kirshner, soccer player and soccer coach
 Robert E. Mulcahy, athletic director
 Stephen Peterson, men's rowing coach (1992-1995)
 Mike Rice Jr., men's basketball coach (2010-2013)
 George Sanford, football coach (1913–1923)
 Greg Schiano, football coach (2001–2011, 2020–present)
 Terry Shea, football coach (1996–2000); later a coach with Kansas City Chiefs, Chicago Bears, Miami Dolphins, and St. Louis Rams
 C. Vivian Stringer
 Dick Vitale, assistant basketball coach (1970–72); coach of the Detroit Pistons; sports commentator

Fictional characters
 Todd Anderson, The Cookout
 Jackie Aprile, Jr., The Sopranos
 Lt. Joseph Cable, USMC, South Pacific
 Richard Cooper, I Think I Love My Wife
 Jason Gervasi, The Sopranos (Newark)
 Harriet Hayes, Studio 60 on the Sunset Strip
 Rufus Humphrey, Gossip Girl
 Neil Klugman, protagonist and narrator of Philip Roth's novel Goodbye Columbus, winner of the 1960 National Book Award
 Liz Lemler, 30 Rock
 Mr. Magoo, 1950s cartoon character
 Lucy McClane, Live Free or Die Hard (Camden)
 OSS Agent / German Mole Bill O'Connor, played by Richard Conte in the film 13 Rue Madeleine
 Jason Parisi, The Sopranos (Newark)
 Agent Dylan Rhodes, in the film Now You See Me
 Agent Shavers, in the film Runner Runner 
 Oscar Wao, The Brief Wondrous Life of Oscar Wao

Notes and references

Online resources
 Rutgers notable alumni 
 Rutgers Business School distinguished alumni
 Scarlet Knights History Hall of Fame

Lists of people by university or college in New Jersey